Cunonia is a genus of shrubs and trees in the family Cunoniaceae. The genus has a disjunct distribution, with 24 species endemic to New Caledonia in the Pacific, and one species (Cunonia capensis) in Southern Africa. Leaves are opposite, simple or pinnate with a margin entire to serrate. Interpetiolar stipules are often conspicuous and generally enclose buds to form a spoon-like shape (hence the common name  "butterspoon tree" for Cunonia capensis). Flowers are bisexual, white, red (pink to purple), or green, arranged in racemes. The fruit is a capsule opening first around the base then vertically, seeds are winged.

List of species 

Southern Africa
 Cunonia capensis 

New Caledonia
 Cunonia × alticola 
 Cunonia aoupiniensis 
 Cunonia atrorubens 
 Cunonia austrocaledonica 
 Cunonia balansae 
 Cunonia bopopensis 
 Cunonia bullata 
 Cunonia cerifera 
 Cunonia deplanchei 
 Cunonia dickisonii 
 Cunonia × koghicola 
 Cunonia lenormandii 
 Cunonia linearisepala 
 Cunonia macrophylla 
 Cunonia montana 
 Cunonia pseudoverticillata 
 Cunonia pterophylla 
 Cunonia pulchella 
 Cunonia purpurea 
 Cunonia rotundifolia 
 Cunonia rupicola 
 Cunonia schinziana 
 Cunonia varijuga 
 Cunonia vieillardii

References

Cunoniaceae
Oxalidales genera